Francine Niyomukunzi (born 1 August 1999) is a Burundian long-distance runner. In 2019, she competed in the senior women's race at the 2019 IAAF World Cross Country Championships held in Aarhus, Denmark. She finished in 74th place.

In 2017, she competed in the junior women's race at the 2017 IAAF World Cross Country Championships held in Kampala, Uganda. She finished in 20th place. In 2020, she competed in the women's half marathon at the 2020 World Athletics Half Marathon Championships held in Gdynia, Poland.

References

External links 
 

Living people
1999 births
Place of birth missing (living people)
Burundian female long-distance runners
Burundian female cross country runners
20th-century Burundian people
21st-century Burundian people